The Mexican Border War, or the Border Campaign, refers to the military engagements which took place in the Mexican–American border region of North America during the Mexican Revolution. The period of the war encompassed World War I, and the German Empire attempted to have Mexico attack the United States, as well as engaging in hostilities against American forces there itself.

The Border War was the fifth and last major conflict fought on American soil, its predecessors being the American Revolutionary War, War of 1812, Mexican–American War (1846–1848) and the American Civil War. The end of the Mexican Revolution on 1 December 1920, marked the close of the American Frontier. The Bandit War in Texas was part of the Border War.

From the beginning of the Mexican Revolution in 1910, the United States Army was stationed in force along the border and, on several occasions, fought with Mexican rebels or federals. The height of the conflict came in 1916 when revolutionary Pancho Villa attacked the American border town of Columbus, New Mexico. In response, the United States Army, under the direction of General John J. Pershing, launched a "Punitive expedition" into northern Mexico, to find and capture Villa. Although Villa was not captured, the US Army found and engaged the Villista rebels, killing Villa's two top lieutenants. The revolutionary himself escaped and the American army returned to the United States in January 1917.

Conflict at the border continued, however, and the United States launched several smaller operations into Mexican territory until after the American victory in the Battle of Ambos Nogales in August 1918, which led to the establishment of a permanent border wall. Conflict was not limited to battles between Villistas and Americans; Maderistas, Carrancistas, Constitutionalistas and Germans also engaged with American forces in that period. Another aspect of the Border Wars was the desire of the United States to control the flow of immigrants into the U.S. to help counter rebel raids in U.S. territory. In 1914, the United States occupied Veracruz, aiming to cut off supplies of ammunition from the German Empire to Mexico at the start of World War I.

Timeline

1910
Revolutionary activity breaks out in Mexico.
United States Army deploys to several more border towns to protect American lives and property and to ensure that fighting between rebel and federal forces remains on the Mexican side of the border.
In late 1910, Francisco Madero issues the Plan of San Luis Potosí, a proclamation which called for Mexican citizens to rise up against the federal government of Porfirio Díaz, in San Antonio, Texas.
On 20 November, Madero planned to attack the border town of Ciudad Porfirio Diaz, Coahuila, across the border from Eagle Pass, Texas. Due to the lack of reinforcements, Madero canceled the operation and left to New Orleans, Louisiana, to prepare another plan.

1911
Porfirio Díaz pressured the United States government into issuing orders for Madero's arrest. Madero escapes across the border back into Mexico on 14 February.
Magonistas began campaigning in northern Baja California in February. They captured the Mexican border town of Mexicali on 11 February and then marched to Tijuana where they defeated the federal garrison. The Mexican government retaliated and attacked Tijuana in June, forcing the rebels to cross the border and surrender to the United States Army at San Ysidro, California.
In March, Francisco Madero led 130 men at the Battle of Casas Grandes in Chihuahua. The rebels lost the battle, but later the federals retreated which left Madero's army in control. Madero then began smuggling arms and ammunition on a large scale from across the border.
On 16 March, rebel saboteurs in Ciudad Juárez bombed the barracks and homes of the Mexican Army garrison. A large nitroglycerin explosion was seen from the American side of the border. Two days later, a large cannon which sat in the town square of El Paso, Texas, disappeared and was presumably taken to Ciudad Juárez.
Maderista rebels fought federal troops loyal to Porfirio Díaz at Agua Prieta, Sonora, in April. United States troops across the border in Douglas, Arizona, were attacked by Mexican forces and in response the Americans intervened which left the rebels in control of the town.
Madero's rebels under Pancho Villa and Pascual Orozco attacked federal forces at the major Second Battle of Ciudad Juarez from 7 April-10 May. The American garrison of El Paso, Texas, exchanged fire with rebels resulting in minor casualties on both sides.
Porfirio Díaz exiled. Francisco Madero becomes President of Mexico and calls for an end to warfare in the country. He offered to pay rebels of different factions but only if they would lay down their arms or join his new federal Army.
Fighting breaks out between rebel factions.

1912
United States Army continues garrisoning American border towns.
El Paso slows guns and ammunition exports into Mexico almost completely due to the increase of undercover Mexican and American Secret Service agents and informants throughout Mexico's border cities.
This was bad for Pasqual Orozco and President Madero due to El Paso being one of the largest recruiting centers for volunteers on both sides of the rebellion.
This caused General Orozco to travel further to gain ammunition and weapons. But, in the spring of 1912, General Orozco and his men had more than 5 million rounds of ammunition.
General Pasqual Orozco rebels against President Madero and begins a campaign in the border state of Chihuahua. Madero responds by sending an army which defeated Orozco's troops in three major battles. Villa rebels against the Madero government soon after.
The United States liked President Madero and was a huge help in preventing the rebellion from General Orozco. This ultimately gave the Mexican government' "probably the most effective Mexican intelligence network on the border during the revolution."
Federal forces of President Francisco Madero establish Fort Tijuana along the international border with California in response to the Magonista campaign.

1913
Nogales, Sonora, was attacked by General Obregón's army of over 2,000 Constitutionalistas in 1913. Defending federal forces under General Emilio Kosterlitzky collapsed and surrendered to the United States Army garrison of Nogales, Arizona.
The Battle of Naco is fought. Álvaro Obregón's rebel army defeated the federal Mexican border town garrison of Naco, Sonora. United States troops watched the battle from across the border.
American troops in Naco, Arizona, begin construction of Fort Naco, one of 12 forts built by the United States Army along the border for protection against warring Mexican forces.
General John Pershing and Pancho Villa meet at Fort Bliss, Texas, and would meet again later in 1914 at Ojinaga, Chihuahua.

1914
On 9 April, the Tampico Affair, an incident in Tampico, Tamaulipas, between United States Navy sailors and Mexican troops, occurred. It resulted in the severing of diplomatic relations between Mexico and the United States.
In response to the Tampico Affair, President Woodrow Wilson asked Congress to approve an armed invasion of Mexico.
Congress approves the invasion. The United States Navy's Atlantic fleet under Admiral Frank Fletcher was sent to the port of Veracruz and occupied the city after an amphibious assault and a street battle with Mexican defenders.
The longest battle of the Mexican Revolution was fought at Naco, Sonora, across the border from Fort Naco and Naco, Arizona. Pancho Villa's men attacked General Obregón's garrison on 17 October. During the 119 following days of siege warfare Villa was defeated. Also during the battle several United States Army Buffalo Soldiers stationed in Naco, Arizona, were wounded by rebels shooting into their camp. Eight men were wounded but they did not return fire and were later recognized for their good discipline.
Pancho Villa and Emiliano Zapata capture Mexico City but soon after are forced to retreat by Álvaro Obregón's army.

1915
Carrancistas draft the Plan de San Diego, an operation to overthrow the state governments of Texas, New Mexico, Arizona, and California by starting a race war. The plan was discovered by the Americans after a Carrancista leader was arrested in Texas though some fighting did occur in the form of raids, launched by rebels into Texas territory.
Pancho Villa attacks General Obregón's Constitutionalist garrison at Nogales, Sonora. Villa initiated a siege but over time was defeated due to the lack of artillery and insufficient supplies. During the siege the United States 12th Infantry garrison of Nogales, Arizona was attacked by Villistas and in turn skirmished for a half hour. One American was killed along with several of Villa's rebels.
Villistas and Constitutionalists fought again at Agua Prieta in November. Later, Villa attributed his defeat to large searchlights used during the battle by the United States Army garrison of Douglas, Arizona. The battle ended in defeat for Villa and led to the more disastrous Battle of Hermosillo on 15 November. At this time, Villa's forces pillaged the city instead of fighting the garrison, resulting in a repulse. Constitutionalist forces were allowed access to American railways for troop movement.

1916
The January 1916 San Isabel Massacre occurred. Villistas stopped a train near Santa Isabel, Chihuahua, and killed eighteen American passengers from the ASARCO company of Tucson, Arizona.
Now losing the war, Pancho Villa decided to raid Columbus, New Mexico, for supplies on 9 March 1916. The raid did not go as planned and Villa's 500 cavalrymen were defeated by over 300 United States infantry and cavalry who were stationed in a border fort outside of town. Columbus was heavily damaged by the Villistas who burned several of the town's buildings. Sixty to eighty Villistas were killed along with over a dozen American troops and civilians.
In response to the attack on Columbus, President Wilson ordered General John J. Pershing to proceed into Mexico with over 5,000 men to capture or kill Pancho Villa, thus beginning the Pancho Villa Expedition.
On 5 May, Villa's rebels attacked two more American border towns, Glenn Springs, Texas, and Boquillas, Texas. Over 200 men under Rodriguez Ramirez and Natividad Álvarez crossed the Texas border with the intention of capturing supplies. At Glenn Springs, a United States Army squad of nine men resisted the Villista attack for several hours but eventually the raiders set fire to the adobe building the Americans were held up in and forced the 14th Infantry men to retreat. Three of the United States troops were killed and four others were wounded. One young American boy was also killed by the Mexicans. At Boquillas,  from Glenn Springs, the Americans there captured Alvarez and discovered he was a lieutenant colonel in Pancho Villa's División del Norte and was a veteran of the Battle of Celaya.
The raiders of Glenn Springs and Boquillas took two captives with them when they withdrew across the border, Jesse Deemer and Monroe Payne, who were later rescued by American Army forces during a small cavalry expedition into Mexico. The expedition of eighty men, two wagons and a car began on 8 May from Marathon, Texas, and was under the command of Colonel Frederick W. Sibley and Colonel George T. Langhorne. The rebels were held up at El Pino, Chihuahua, and at first Colonel Langhorne negotiated for the release of the two Americans and when this failed he ordered his men to embark his personal car and head for El Pino. Upon their arrival the Villistas fled and Deemer and Payne were freed. During the operation which ended on 21 May, five Mexicans were killed in skirmishes with no American losses.
In May 1916, President Wilson ordered the National Guard to reinforce the United States Army garrisons at the border line. By August, an estimated 117,000 guardsmen were stationed along the border in Texas, New Mexico, Arizona and California.
On 12 April, American forces and Carrancistas fought the Battle of Parral in Chihuahua. When United States troops under Major Frank Tompkins attempted to leave the city of Parral, they were attacked by Carrancista riflemen. The Americans returned fire, and over the course of several hours 45 Mexicans lay dead along with two Americans. The engagement marked the furthest penetration into northern Mexico by American forces, Parral is over 500 miles from the border.
In June, Buffalo Soldiers of the 10th Cavalry suffered a defeat at the Battle of Carrizal. Federal Mexican troops attacked 150 cavalrymen when they attempted to enter the town of Carrizal. The most famous battle of the Border war was fought and ended with the deaths of 45 Mexicans and more than 100 Americans. Forty-four other Mexicans and Americans were wounded.
Raids on American border towns continued during and for years after the Pancho Villa Expedition. On 15 June, raiders killed four American soldiers at San Ygnacio, Texas. On 31 July, another soldier and a United States customs inspector were killed in a second raid. During both engagements, Mexicans were killed or wounded but their casualties are not known.
Future General George S. Patton of the 8th Cavalry conducted America's first assault with armored vehicles at a ranch near San Miguelito. Three Mexicans were killed, including the Villista General Julio Cárdenas. Patton is said to have carved notches into the pistols he carried, representing the men he killed with them.

1917
Due to the defeat at Carrizal, President Wilson ordered General Pershing to withdraw from Mexico and end the expedition. By January, most of the American expeditionary troops had left Mexican territory and were back at garrison duty along the border.
At this time Germany started sinking merchant ships by U-boat with Europeans and Americans on board. This worried Germany because they thought that the United States would attack and they tried a last ditch effort.
The Zimmermann Telegram was intercepted by the British in 1917. In the telegram the German government formally requested that Mexico join World War I on the side of the Central Powers if the United States declared war on Germany. The Germans asked the Mexicans to attack the southwestern United States and promised to return land to Mexico that was lost to the United States during the Mexican–American War and the Gadsden Purchase.

1918
United States Army Intelligence stationed at Fort Huachuca, Arizona, detected a German military presence in Sonora and ordered troops to begin surveillance operations to prepare for war with Mexico. Mexican railways, train stations, and other related enterprises were inspected as possible routes for a large-scale American invasion.
Revolutionary Yaqui Native Americans established a base in Bear Valley, Arizona, to store weapons intended to be smuggled into Mexico. When the base was discovered by the United States Army, Blondy Ryder of the 10th Cavalry was ordered to evict the rebel Yaquis. On 9 January, Ryder's patrol attacked the Yaquis in a small half-hour engagement. The camp was destroyed, one Yaqui was killed, and nine others were captured. The United States Cavalry suffered no casualties.
In mid-August, Lieutenant Colonel Frederick J. Herman received an anonymous message from a Mexican revolutionary about a possible attack on Nogales, Arizona, by Mexican federal soldiers and a group of German military advisers. On 27 August, a Mexican suspected of gun smuggling crossed the border into Nogales, Sonora, followed by a US Customs agent and two US Army troops. A Mexican soldier watched the incident and fired on the American agent. The shot was a miss but hit one of the soldiers, and the other two Americans returned fire and killed the Mexican soldier. From there, the incident escalated from a small dispute into the Battle of Ambos Nogales. Reinforcements from both sides rushed to the border to fight; men of the 35th Infantry Regiment called for aid, and a squadron of 10th Cavalry under Herman responded. When they arrived, they attacked the Mexican positions on top of hills along the other side of the border. The assault was successful and the Mexican troops with their German advisers were defeated. In all, 30–129 Mexicans, two Germans, and seven Americans died in the fighting. After the battle, German military activity in Sonora ceased. The Battle of Ambos Nogales was the last major engagement of the Border War.

1919
American and Mexican forces skirmished near El Paso, Texas, on the border on 16 June in what was known as the Battle of Ciudad Juárez. This conflict is singular for the fact that the Mexican army and the American army joined forces to fight the Villistas led by Pancho Villa. It was the second-largest battle of the Mexican Revolution involving the United States, and is considered the last battle of the Border War. Although there were other incursions like the US military crossings into Mexico during the Candelaria border incursion of 1919.
The treaty of Versailles was signed on 28 June at the Palace of Versailles which stated that Germany and all opposing nations agree on peace and war reparations be made due to all of the damage done to cities and innocent people. This was also known as the most important peace treaty of World War 1.

The Borderlands 
The 1910s saw escalated violence between Anglo-Americans and Mexican-Americans in Texas. There were numerous instances violence, including lynchings, against Mexicans by vigilantes, and law enforcement, such as the Texas Rangers. Violence was at its highest from 1915 to 1919, in response to the Plan de San Diego by Mexican and Tejano insurgents to conquer Texas. This further increased the prevalence of anti-Mexican sentiment. At least 300 Mexican Americans were killed in Texas during the 1910s, with total estimates ranging from hundreds to thousands killed. At least 100 Mexican Americans were lynched in the 1910s, mostly in Texas. 20 percent of all recorded lynching's of Mexicans in the United States occurred between 1910 and 1920. About 400 Anglo-Texans were also killed total in unrest and attacks along the border during the 1910s, and much property was destroyed.

World War I 
World War I, also known as the Great War (1914–18) was the first war that involved most if not all major countries throughout the world such as Germany, Turkey and Austria-Hungary which were the enemy forces and France, Great Britain, Russia, Italy, Japan and later on the United States that made up the allied forces. In 1914, Germany demanded that Russia immobilize their forces and France to do nothing of Germany invades Russia and neither countries agreed. This altercation on 1 August 1914 started the declaration of war against Russia and France and started the mobilization of armed forces from Germany. Entering 1915, the allied forces were accomplishing nothing and the central powers were still strong. For the next 2 years, nothing outstanding happened until Germany started sinking merchant ships (unrestricted submarine warfare) around 1917 that had United States citizens aboard. This caused the United States to enter World War I on the allied side on 6 April 1917. With defeat eminent and multiple central power empires collapsing, the leader of Germany, Kaiser Wilhelm was forces to resign on 9 November 1918. The end of World War I ultimately caused the collapse of the Russian Empire, German Empire, Austria-Hungary Empire, the Ottoman Empire and most dictatorships throughout the world at the time.

Occupation of Veracruz 
In 1914, Mexico arrested some American sailors that were in the wrong part of the city. After they were released, Mexican authorities forgot a 21 gun salute which then led to a 7-month occupation of Veracruz that killed hundreds on both sides of the conflict.

The Mexican Revolution 
During the Mexican Border Wars, there was a series of revolutionary attacks on the Mexican Government and Military that started in 1910 and was most prolific throughout 1920. Francisco I. Madero challenged Porfirio Díaz in the election, who has been a longtime Mexican president but recently sent the citizens into economic struggles. Madero lost to an unfair ballot and this caused uprisings throughout Mexico which made Diaz lose control and overthrew him in 1911. After Madero gained control, he had to defend himself from other powerful leaders such as Bernardo Reyes and Victoriano Huerta. They believed that Madero was attacking for the wrong reasons and were able to end his leadership in 1913. This caused a series of attacks against powerful regional leaders throughout Mexico for the next 7 years. In 1914, leaders such as Venustiano Carranza and Pancho Villa overthrew Huerta and Reyes' regime until 1915. Carranza later betrayed Pancho Villa and by 1917, Carranza created the Constitution of Mexico and the Land reform in Mexico as well as other important documents and increased the power of the federal government.

See also
Bandit War
Border War (disambiguation)
List of border wars
Mexican–American War
Mexican Revolution
Pancho Villa Expedition
United States involvement in the Mexican Revolution
World War I
Roosevelt Reservation

References

Notes

Bibliography
Britton, John A. Revolution and Ideology Images of the Mexican Revolution in the United States. Louisville: The University Press of Kentucky (1995)

Barnes, Alexander; (2016-02-26). "On The Border: The National Guard Mobilizes for war in 1916
Johnson, Jack;  "1916: Trial Run on the Mexican Border"

Wars fought in Arizona
History of Mexico
Wars involving the United States
Mexican Revolution
American frontier
1910s in Mexico
1910s in the United States
United States involvement in regime change